Jaclyn Tohn is an American actress and musician. She is best known for playing Melanie "MelRose" Rosen on the Netflix series GLOW, and for taking part in American Idol season 8, making it to Top 36 (the Semi-finals). She also took part in the 2011 songwriting competition series Platinum Hit on the Bravo network.

Early life
Tohn was born and raised in a Jewish family in Oceanside, Long Island, New York, to physical education teachers Alan and Bella Tohn. She has two older brothers.

Tohn began acting professionally while still a grade school student. She was a student at Boardman Middle School. After high school, she attended the University of Delaware and majored in elementary education, and in the fall of 1998 was in the a cappella group the Deltones.

Career
Tohn's onscreen debut was made at age 10, with an extra role on the PBS children's series Ghostwriter. Her first credited role was on the CBS sitcom The Nanny.

In November 1999, she starred in the one-act play This Property is Condemned by Tennessee Williams at the Chapel Street Theatre. She moved to Los Angeles with her mother and agent at the time. She played Tina in Tony-n-Tina's Wedding at the Henry Fonda Theatre in Los Angeles. She also originated the role of Joanie in Body Snatchers: The Musical at the Odyssey Theatre in Los Angeles.

In March 2004, she starred in the play Jewtopia at the Coast Playhouse in West Hollywood in Los Angeles. The producers then decided to move the play to the Westside Arts Theater in New York and she relocated.

She began performing solo acoustic guitar shows in April 2004. In November 2005, she released an EP, The Golden Girl, recorded at a studio in Tarrytown, New York. She has played at Pianos, The Living Room, CBGB, The Cutting Room, and The Rothko in New York and at Highland Grounds, The Mint, and Wizard Finger in Los Angeles.

She has appeared in the films Dawg in 2002 (also known as Bad Boy) alongside Denis Leary, Deuces Wild as Mary Ann, and Return to Sleepaway Camp as Linda. She appeared as Faith in the film Postal and appeared in the 2008 television film Giants of Radio.

Tohn performed in a pilot for MTV called Show Me The Movie and a pilot for Fox called Prudy and Judy, starring alongside Laura Bell Bundy. She has appeared in the television series The Sopranos, Strangers with Candy, Angel, Rules of Engagement, Veronica Mars and It's Always Sunny in Philadelphia.

In 2007, she appeared in the short films Smile, Discovering The Wheels, The Malibu Myth, The Legend of Donkey-Tail Willie and Catch (where she was shown playing the guitar) which were made during the reality show On the Lot.

Tohn was a contestant on season eight of American Idol and made it to the top-34. Tohn was also featured on hip-hop artist Gotham Green's single "Been Doin' It".

In 2009, Tohn appeared on the eighth season of American Idol and made it through to the Hollywood rounds. She advanced through the Hollywood rounds, making the Top 36 for season 8 and was in the first group of 12 to perform. She performed "A Little Less Conversation" from Elvis Presley during Top 36 (Group 1) under the theme Billboard Hot 100 Hits to Date and was eliminated without advancing to the finals.

In 2011, she appeared on the songwriting-competition reality show Platinum Hit on the American cable network Bravo as one of 12 aspiring songwriters. She reached 7th place. In 2013, Tohn appeared on House of Lies.

In 2016, she was cast in the Netflix series GLOW.

In 2019, Tohn appeared in Epic Rap Battles of History portraying Joan Rivers in the episode "George Carlin vs Richard Pryor". In 2019, Tohn was the host of The Howard Stern Show Sternthology's week-long show of [Wack History Month].

Tohn is a judge on the 2020 Netflix cooking competition show Best Leftovers Ever! alongside Rosemary Shrager and David So.

In 2021, Tohn co-created and starred in Do, Re & Mi, an animated series produced by Gaumont for Amazon Prime Video.

Filmography

Film

Television

Discography

Studio albums

References

External links
Official website

Actresses from New York (state)
American child actresses
American film actresses
American Idol participants
American blues singers
American women singer-songwriters
American rhythm and blues singer-songwriters
American women pop singers
21st-century American singers
American television actresses
20th-century American actresses
21st-century American actresses
American stage actresses
Living people
Singer-songwriters from New York (state)
People from Oceanside, New York
21st-century American guitarists
Guitarists from New York (state)
21st-century American women singers
21st-century American women guitarists
Year of birth missing (living people)